The 1981 U.S. Pro Tennis Championships was a men's tennis tournament played on outdoor green clay courts at the Longwood Cricket Club in Chestnut Hill, Massachusetts in the United States. The event was part of the Super Series of the 1981 Volvo Grand Prix circuit. It was the 54th edition of the tournament and was held from July 13 through July 19, 1981. First-seeded José Luis Clerc won the singles title.

Finals

Singles
 José Luis Clerc defeated  Hans Gildemeister 0–6, 6–2, 6–2
 It was Clerc' 3rd singles title of the year and the 13th of his career.

Doubles
 Pavel Složil /  Raúl Ramírez defeated  Hans Gildemeister /  Andrés Gómez 6–4, 7–6

References

External links
 ITF tournament edition details
 Longwood Cricket Club – list of U.S. Pro Champions

U.S. Pro Tennis Championships
U.S. Pro Championships
U.S. Pro Championships
U.S. Pro Championships
U.S. Pro Championships
Chestnut Hill, Massachusetts
Clay court tennis tournaments
History of Middlesex County, Massachusetts
Sports in Middlesex County, Massachusetts
Tennis tournaments in Massachusetts
Tourist attractions in Middlesex County, Massachusetts